The 2004–2005 LEB season was the 9th season of the Liga Española de Baloncesto, second tier of the Spanish basketball.

LEB standings

LEB Oro Playoffs
The two winners of the semifinals are promoted to Liga ACB.

Relegation playoffs

Club Ourense Baloncesto, relegated to LEB-2.

TV coverage
TVE2
Teledeporte

See also 
Liga Española de Baloncesto

LEB Oro seasons
LEB2
Second level Spanish basketball league seasons